Year 157 (CLVII) was a common year starting on Friday (link will display the full calendar) of the Julian calendar. At the time, it was known as the Year of the Consulship of Civica and Aquillus (or, less frequently, year 910 Ab urbe condita). The denomination 157 for this year has been used since the early medieval period, when the Anno Domini calendar era became the prevalent method in Europe for naming years.

Events 
 By place 
 Roman Empire 
A revolt against Roman rule begins in Dacia.

Births 
 Gaius Caesonius Macer Rufinianus, Roman politician (d. 237)
 Hua Xin, Chinese official and minister (d. 232)
 Liu Yao, Chinese governor and warlord (d. 198)
 Xun You, Chinese official and statesman (d. 214)

Deaths

References